Already is the debut album by British band Edison Lighthouse, released in 1971. It features three singles: both "Love Grows (Where My Rosemary Goes)" and "It's Up to You Petula" became chart hits in the UK, US, Canada and New Zealand, while the third, "What's Happening", became a regional hit in Australia (No. 43, Adelaide).

Three other songs on the LP were covers of international chart hits by other artists: "United We Stand" by Brotherhood of Man, "Take Me in Your Arms" by Jefferson, and "Don't You Know (She Said Hello)" by Butterscotch.

Track listing
Side A
"What's Happening" (Arnold, Martin, Morrow)
"Take Me in Your Arms" (Macaulay, McLeod)
"That's Julie All Over" (Arnold, Martin, Morrow)
"Let's Make It Up" (Arnold, Martin, Morrow)
"She Works in a Woman's Way" (Mason, Macaulay)
"Love Grows (Where My Rosemary Goes)" (Barry Mason, Tony Macaulay)

Side B 
"Don't You Know (She Said Hello)" (Arnold, Martin, Morrow)
"United We Stand" (Hiller Simons)
"The Closer to You" (Arnold, Martin, Morrow)
"Take a Little Time" (Edward Light)
"It's Up to You Petula" (Arnold, Martin, Morrow)

Personnel
 Paul Vigrass – lead vocals
 Wal Scott – lead guitar
 David Kerr-Clemenson – bass
 Andy Locke – rhythm guitar
 Eddie Richards – drums

Singles

References

1971 debut albums
Bell Records albums
Edison Lighthouse albums
Albums produced by Geoff Morrow
Albums produced by Tony Macaulay